Divaena is a genus of moths of the family Noctuidae.

Species
 Divaena haywardi (Tams, 1926)

References
Natural History Museum Lepidoptera genus database
Divaena at funet

Noctuinae